Vadim Gulceac (born 6 August 1998) is a Moldovan footballer who plays as a forward for CSF Bălți. In his career also played for teams such as Zaria Bălți or Petrocub Hîncești.

References

External links

1998 births
Living people
Moldovan footballers
Moldova youth international footballers
Moldova under-21 international footballers
Association football forwards
Moldovan Super Liga players
AFC Unirea Slobozia players
CSF Bălți players
CS Petrocub Hîncești players
Liga II players
Moldovan expatriate footballers
Moldovan expatriate sportspeople in Romania